The 63rd Street Shuttle was the name given to three shuttle trains that served the 63rd Street Lines of the New York City Subway during various times from 1997 to 2001.

Sixth Avenue

Two of the shuttles ran along the IND Sixth Avenue Line.

The first shuttle, designated with an orange S, began in August 1997. It ran late nights only from 21st Street–Queensbridge to Second Avenue via the IND 63rd Street Line and IND Sixth Avenue Line making local stops. Prior to that,  and  trains served the IND 63rd Street Line during late nights. This service was suspended in February 1998 when construction suspended service between the 63rd Street Line and the Sixth Avenue Line,  but it resumed in May 1999 when the construction was completed. It was discontinued in 2000 when preparation for full-time service on the IND 63rd Street Connector began.

The second shuttle, also with an orange bullet, began on July 22, 2001, due to the closure of the north tracks on the Manhattan Bridge. It ran between 21st Street–Queensbridge and Broadway–Lafayette Street, running an almost identical route to the first. On December 16, 2001, the 63rd Street connector to the IND Queens Boulevard Line opened and the  train was rerouted to serve the IND 63rd Street Line at all times, permanently replacing this shuttle. At the same time, the Grand Street Shuttle was lengthened to West Fourth Street–Washington Square.

Broadway

This service, designated with a yellow S, ran at all times during reconstruction of the IND 63rd Street Line between February 22, 1998, and May 22, 1999. Originally running between 21st Street–Queensbridge and 57th Street–Seventh Avenue on the BMT Broadway Line via the BMT 63rd Street Line, it was extended to 34th Street–Herald Square on weekdays starting April 6, 1998, skipping 49th Street. The shuttle stopped at the downtown platform at 34th Street. During this time,  and  trains terminated at 57th Street–Sixth Avenue, which was closed late nights, while the late night Sixth Avenue shuttle was suspended.

Final route

Notes

References

External links
S Train Special Shuttle, MTA service notice, 1998
Manhattan Bridge Service Changes, MTA service notice, 2001

Defunct New York City Subway services
 S 63rd Street